West Gloucester station is an MBTA Commuter Rail station on the Newburyport/Rockport Line, located off Massachusetts Route 133 (Essex Road) in the west part of Gloucester, Massachusetts.

History
A number of infill stations were later added; West Gloucester station was open by 1872, and by 1884 had a small depot building on the south side of the track. That building was gone by 1977.

The line was temporarily closed on January 7, 1985, after a November 1984 fire destroyed the drawbridge between Salem and Beverly. When the line reopened on December 1, 1985, West Gloucester was reopened but Harbor remained closed.

On April 29, 2020, service between West Gloucester and Rockport was indefinitely replaced by buses due to a failure of the old Gloucester Drawbridge. That June, the MBTA indicated the closure would continue until the completion of the bridge replacement. Regular service to Rockport over the bridge resumed on May 23, 2022.

References

External links

MBTA - West Gloucester

Buildings and structures in Gloucester, Massachusetts
MBTA Commuter Rail stations in Essex County, Massachusetts
Stations along Boston and Maine Railroad lines